James Ferguson (19 February 1848 – 10 May 1913) was an Australian cricketer. He played two first-class matches for Tasmania between 1870 and 1878.

See also
 List of Tasmanian representative cricketers

References

External links
 

1848 births
1913 deaths
Australian cricketers
Tasmania cricketers
Cricketers from Launceston, Tasmania